Huang Teh-fu (born 3 August 1954) is a Taiwanese political scientist and politician who served in the Legislative Yuan from 2002 to 2008.

Education and early career
Huang earned a bachelor's and master's degree in political science from National Chengchi University, and later obtained a doctoral degree in the subject from Northwestern University in the United States. Upon returning to Taiwan, Huang joined the faculty of NCCU. In 2000, Huang proposed that several party positions be directly elected. The implementation of Huang's reforms resulted in the first direct election for Kuomintang chairman held in March 2001.

Political career
Huang led the National Youth Commission from March 1997 to February 1998. In 2001, he was elected to the Legislative Yuan for the first time. During his first term as a legislator, Huang supported the passage of sunshine laws, and backed the renaming of Chiang Kai-shek Memorial Hall to Presidents' Memorial Hall. He was a strong proponent for the use of absentee ballots. By mid-2004, Huang was the deputy whip for the Kuomintang legislative caucus, and was promoted at the start of the legislative session that began in July.

After the Central Election Commission announced that the 2004 general elections, were scheduled for 11 December, Huang led criticism of the CEC, stating that the commission's decision favored the Democratic Progressive Party because the chosen election date was near the 25th anniversary of the 1979 Kaohsiung Incident. The Kuomintang announced that Huang ranked eighth on its party list in September 2004. Shortly after his reelection, Huang stepped down as caucus whip. Upon the conclusion of Huang's second term in the legislature, he was named executive director of the Foundation for Democracy, despite opposition from the leadership of the group, some of whom subsequently resigned from the organization.

References

1954 births
Living people
National Chengchi University alumni
Academic staff of the National Chengchi University
Taiwanese political scientists
Party List Members of the Legislative Yuan
Kuomintang Members of the Legislative Yuan in Taiwan
Members of the 5th Legislative Yuan
Members of the 6th Legislative Yuan
Politicians of the Republic of China on Taiwan from Taipei
Northwestern University alumni